Parliamentary elections were held in Colombia on 13 March 2022.

Electoral system
Of the 166 members of the House of Representatives, 162 were elected by proportional representation from 33 multi-member constituencies based on the departments, with seats allocated using the largest remainder method. Two members were elected by the Afro-Colombian community, one by Indigenous community, and one by Colombian expatriates. The 102 Senators were elected by two methods; 100 from a single nationwide constituency by proportional representation (with seats allocated using the largest remainder) and two from a two-seat constituency for Indigenous Colombians.

Commons, the political successor of the former rebel group FARC, were guaranteed five seats in the House and five in the Senate as part of the Colombian peace process. For the first time, 16 seats in the House, as agreed to during the negotiations in Havana and ratified by an act of legislation on 25 August 2021, were reserved for victims of the Colombian conflict. Citizens from 167 municipalities affected by the conflict were eligible for voting in the special victims constituency.

Results

Senate

Chamber of Representatives

Aftermath

Following the electoral triumph of Gustavo Petro in the 2022 Colombian presidential election, Petro's coalition Historic Pact allied with the Liberal Party. The Liberal leader, César Gaviria, assured that the alliance would "allow the president-elect to overcome a political hurdle", which would provide the Historic Pact with less difficulty in advancing their agenda. The Conservative Party expressed no interest in being an opposition bloc with the party caucus ultimately voting to support the Historic Pact. The decision caused tension within the party as many opposed the move and led to party leader Omar Yepes' resignation. The Party of the U also declared they would not serve as an opposition bloc and contemplated whether to join the government or remain neutral. Meanwhile, the party of outgoing president Iván Duque, the Democratic Center, said they would be in the opposition. The Party of the U announced on 19 July that it would join the governing coalition.

The elected senators and members of the Chamber of Representatives were sworn in on 20 July 2022.

See also
2022 Colombian presidential election

References

Colombia
Parliamentary election
Colombia
Parliamentary elections in Colombia
Election and referendum articles with incomplete results